Arkeology is a compilation album by World Party released on April 10, 2012 in the US and on May 28, 2012 in the UK.

The album is composed almost entirely of previously unreleased material: 70 tracks including new songs finished as recently as 2011 ("Words", "Everybody’s Falling In Love" and "Photograph"), plus an "unheard history of rare studio gems, live sessions, concert recordings, radio interviews, covers, demos and B-sides."

Track listing

Disc 1 
 "Waiting Such a Long Time" (3:58)
 "Nothing Lasts Forever" (4:04)
 "Everybody's Falling in Love" (3:49)
 "Where Are You Going When You Go?" (2:29)
 "Photograph" (4:52)
 "Everybody Dance Now" (5:23)
 "Closer Still" (1:07)
 "I Want to Be Free" (2:51)
 "I'm Only Dozing" (4:27)
 "No More Crying" (4:20)
 "Interview/Sweet Soul Dream radio appearance" (8:45)

Disc 2 
 "Lucille" (2:28)
 "The Good Old Human Race" (3:25)
 "Put the Message in the Box — live 1993" (4:34)
 "Trouble Down Here" (4:59)
 "Basically" (4:47)
 "Silly Song" (0:37)
 "Man We Was Lonely" (2:57)
 "She's the One — live 1996" (4:33)
 "Ship of Fools — live" (5:53)
 "Mystery Girl radio session" (3:07)
 "This Is Your World Speaking" (9:03)
 "All the Love That's Wasted" (4:32)
 "Lost in Infinity" (6:13)
 "New Light — demo" (1:38)

Disc 3 
 "Words" (5:28)
 "Dear Prudence" (3:04)
 "Call Me Up radio session" (4:31)
 "Like a Rolling Stone — live 1993" (8:02)
 "Sooner or Later — live 1994" (5:47)
 "Love Street — live 2006" (5:04)
 "Time on My Hands" (4:37)
 "Who Are You — live 2007" (4:35)
 "Sweetheart Like You" (5:25)
 "Another World" (3:27)
 "You're Beautiful, But Get Out of My Life" (3:46)
 "Living Like the Animals" (4:03)
 "Stand! — live 1991" (4:09)
 "Thank You World — pre-edit" (6:30)

Disc 4 
 "Break Me Again" (9:26)
 "Baby" (5:23)
 "Ship of Fools live 1990" (6:44)
 "Put the Message in the Box — live 2006" (4:08)
 "When Did You Leave Heaven?" (3:11)
 "Nature Girl" (4:21)
 "It's a Pity You Don't Let Go" (3:32)
 "My Pretty One" (2:23)
 "De Ho De Hay" (0:52)
 "We Are the Ones" (4:47)
 "World Groove / Mind Guerilla" (2:47)
 "Happiness Is a Warm Gun" (2:30)
 "Kuwait City" (3:11)
 "Do What I Want" (3:58)
 "All We Need Is Everything — demo" (3:36)
 "Outro" (2:41)

Disc 5 
 "Mystery Girl" (3:33)
 "What Is Love All About (Alt. Drums)" (6:56)
 "I Hope It All Works Out for You — demo" (3:39)
 "And God Said — long version" (0:58)
 "It Ain't Gonna Work" (4:56)
 "Another One" (6:09)
 "I Am Me" (6:00)
 "It's Gonna Be Alright" (1:52)
 "In Another World" (3:33)
 "Thank You World — live 1991" (7:32)
 "Cry Baby Cry" (3:04)
 "Temple of Love" (3:06)
 "Fixing a Hole" (2:43)
 "Way Down Now — live 1991" (6:50)
 "Change the World — demo" (1:46)

References

2012 compilation albums
World Party albums